Brian Gleeson (born 14 November 1987) is an Irish actor. He was nominated for an Irish Film and Television Awards for the television series Love/Hate. He has appeared in Snow White and the Huntsman (2012), Assassin's Creed (2016), and had regular roles in The Bisexual (2018), Resistance and Peaky Blinders (2019), Frank of Ireland (2021), and Bad Sisters in 2022.

Early life
Gleeson was born in Dublin, the son of actor Brendan Gleeson and his wife Mary Weldon. He has three brothers: Domhnall (also an actor), Fergus, and Rory. He grew up in Malahide, Dublin. As a child, he appeared in school plays, before joining the Gaiety's Youth Theatre Company.

Career
Gleeson started acting in 2006, first appearing alongside his father in The Tiger's Tail directed by John Boorman, which was filmed the year he completed the Leaving Certificate. In 2010, Gleeson appeared as Hughie in the first season of Love/Hate, and earned a nomination for an Irish Film and Television Award for Best Actor in a Supporting Role (Television) for the role. He also appeared in the Hollywood film The Eagle. He appeared in the 2012 film Snow White and the Huntsman. Gleeson portrayed the lead role in Standby opposite Jessica Paré in 2014. The same year, he filmed Tiger Raid, based on the Iraq War, in Jordan; it was released in 2016. Along with his father Brendan and brother Domhnall, Gleeson appeared in the Enda Walsh play The Walworth Farce in early 2015. He starred as Jimmy in the 2016 Irish drama series Rebellion, based on the 1916 Easter Rising.

In 2019, Gleeson starred as Jimmy McCavern in Peaky Blinders, although criticized for his version of a Glaswegian accent, deemed acceptable due to his quality acting performance.

Filmography

Awards and nominations

References

External links
 
 

1987 births
21st-century Irish male actors
Irish male film actors
Irish male stage actors
Irish male television actors
Living people
Male actors from Dublin (city)
Gleeson family
People from Malahide